Irtysh, also named Soyuz-5, formerly codenamed Fenix in Russian and Sunkar in Kazakh, is a planned Russian rocket that is being developed by JSC SRC Progress within the "Project Feniks". Initially it will replace the capability of Zenit-2 and Proton Medium, and in the future will serve as the base of a super heavy-lift launch vehicle rocket (Yenisei) to match the Energia/Buran capabilities. , Irtysh is expected to launch from the Baikonur Baiterek, the ex Zenit-2 launch site, in a partnership with the government of Kazakhstan, with a planned debut in 2024.

Project organization 
The current proposal is led by JSC SRC Progress, with support by Khrunichev and Makeyev, additionally, RSC Energia would handle the launch site, and supply the Blok DM-03, while Roscosmos would finance the development through the Project Fenicks under the 2016–2025 Russian space master plan. KazCosmos would also be a partner since the initial launch pad would be at Baikonur Cosmodrome Site 45 in Kazakhstan, within the framework of the Baiterek bi-national joint venture, and International Launch Services (ILS) would commercialize its services for the international market.

The initial application of the launch vehicle would be to cover the under  to GTO commercial launch segment. With the loss of the Zenit-3SLB due to Russian conflicts with Ukraine, both the decision not to develop Angara A3 and launch Angara A5 from Vostochny, the Baiterek project was without a launch vehicle. The 2016 announcement of the Proton Medium and Light meant that ILS could enter the medium GTO launch market, but since the Kazakh government desired to deprecate the use of highly toxic hypergolic propellants used by Proton, they would need a replacement.

For this commercial application, JSC SRC Progress proposed the Soyuz-5 in early 2016. It would start with this commercial application with the prospect of also enabling a super heavy launcher with a  payload capability to low Earth orbit. The Kazakh side agreed on the general terms, but the investment share was left to decide. As part of the 2016 arrangements, the Kazakh government would get ownership of one of the Proton launch pads, and participate in the operations of Proton-Medium and Proton-Light. Then, they would get to participate in the Irtysh launchers since its expected debut in 2024.

Four test launches are planned before the development is considered complete.

Vehicle 
Soyuz-5, as proposed in 2016, leverages existing propulsion and tooling, while enabling a platform that would replace the lost capabilities of the Zenit family, replace the Proton Light/Medium, and could serve as the boosters of a new super heavy rocket. It will initially be a two-stage rocket, but could be enhanced with an optional Blok DM-03 for geostationary missions. It would be compatible with most of the Zenit's ground infrastructure, and even use the Site 45 at Baikonur.

Its tanks would be  in diameter, which would enable the re use of Proton tooling. Since they would be wider than Zenit, it would enable a higher propellant load for the same height. While this diameter enables a heavier rocket and is already compatible with train transport to Baikonur, it would prevent that cheap method for Vostochny Cosmodrome. It would use the relatively environmental friendly RP-1/LOX propellant, which would be an improvement over the highly toxic hypergolics of Proton. This has been a requirement from the Kazakh government for new projects.

The first stage would be powered by an RD-171MV, very similar to the RD-171M used in Zenit 2 and 3. With a height of  it would be higher than Zenit's first stage and wider, and thus it could carry  of propellant versus . Its base would still feature a  aft section for compatibility with Zeni't pad and support infrastructure.

It would be powered by two RD-0124MS engines, each having four nozzles arranged in a semicircle. So, two engines would feature eight total nozzles close to the rocket perimeter, forming a circle. This arrangement would minimize the stage length, while keeping the engines' excellent specific impulse.

With a gross mass of  against Zenit , and the improved efficiency of its second stage, it could launch  to a 200 km circular orbit with an inclination of 51.6° to the Equator from Baikonur.

For geostationary launch missions, it could optionally be equipped with a Blok DM-03 third stage. Since it would use the same propellant and is already used on the Zenit-3SL and Angara A5, it would be a low risk option.

Soyuz-5 Super Heavy (Yenisei) 

The Irtysh first stage could be used as the boosters (and even core) of the super heavy rocket Yenisei capable of launching  to low Earth orbit from Baikonur or Vostochny. While the current 2016-2025 plan for deep space exploration calls for the use of the heavy Angara 5V, it would just enable , requiring up to four launches for a single Moon mission, and would also require the use of expensive hydrogen as fuel. The Yenisei would simplify the mission while using readily available Irtysh first stages.

See also

References

External links
Anatoly Zak's page on the Sunkar

Space launch vehicles of Russia
Proposed space launch vehicles